Louis Albert Banks (November 12, 1855 in Corvallis, Oregon–1933) was an American author and pastor. He was the Progressive nominee for Governor of Massachusetts in 1893.

References

External links
 

Writers from Oregon
1855 births
1933 deaths
Massachusetts politicians
Writers from Corvallis, Oregon